Lewis-Clark Valley AVA is the third northern Idaho  American Viticultural Area. It is located in northern part of the state and a contiguous area of southeastern  Washington  adjacent to the Columbia Valley AVA. About 72%, is located in Idaho with the rest in Washington. The topography consists primarily of deep, V-notched canyons, low plateaus, and bench lands formed by the two rivers. Vineyard elevations are approximately below . There were 3 wineries within the AVA, as well as 16 commercially-producing vineyards when officially established by the Alcohol and Tobacco Tax and Trade Bureau (TTB) in May 2016.

History
Vinifera growing in the Northwest originated in the Lewis-Clark Valley AVA, dating back to 1872.  Varietals such as Petit Syrah, Petit Verdot, and Cabernet Franc were cultivated. By 1908, 40 varieties of grapes were being cultivated. Two years later, the town of Lewiston voted a ban on alcoholic beverages and the industry crashed. Most of the wine was turned into vinegar and winemaking virtually disappeared until the late 1990s.

Industry Success
Lewis-Clark Valley winemakers are using locally grown grapes to create wines that compete on the national market. After its AVA recognition, the Lewis-Clark Valley, with steep river canyons and plateaus, has the state's lowest elevation vineyards that successfully ripen a wide variety of wine grapes with some vinifera originating from 1872.

References

External links
  Lewis Clark Valley Wine Alliance
  TTB AVA Map

Idaho wine
American Viticultural Areas